Research stations in Queen Maud Land are connected by the Dronning Maud Land Air Network Project (DROMLAN), which is a cooperative agreement for transportation between eleven nations with research stations in East Antarctica. Long-range aircraft fly between Cape Town, South Africa and either the Troll Airfield, located at the Troll research station, or the runway at the Novolazarevskaya Station. From these two main airfields, smaller aircraft may fly further to other Antarctic destinations.

Through the Troll Airfield, Norway's Troll station serves as a major hub of the DROMLAN network. Research at Troll include air and atmospheric measurements, monitoring of greenhouse gases and bird colonies, as well as meteorological and climate research. The other Norwegian station, Tor, was established for researching birds at the breeding colony in Svarthamaren Mountain. Activities conducted by Russia's Novolazarevskaya Station include environmental monitoring, geodesy/mapping, geomagnetic and meteorological observations, glaciology, biology, ionosphericauroral observations, limnology, geology, geophysics and seismology.

SANAE IV

South Africa's SANAE IV station, the successor to three former stations, was completed in 1997. Research at SANAE IV include invasion biology/ecology, geology, geomorphology and atmospheric sciences. Its facilities include a small hospital and a two-helicopter hangar. Two smaller nearby structures contain the satellite dish used for communications and the diesel fuel bunkers. Joined end-on-end in a north–south orientation, the base modules are complemented on the northern end by a large raised helicopter landing area with a lifting section allowing vehicles to be brought up into the hangar for maintenance. C-block, the northernmost module, contains the  neutron monitors of the North-West University. The modules are linked by single-story connections that also serve as entrances with stairways down to the surface 4m below the base. Each link contains an entrance hall with two sets of doors (creating a rudimentary 'air-lock' to prevent excessive cooling when entering and exiting the base) as well as a change-room, ablution facility and electronic distribution boards. The base is staffed and maintained year-round by a team of scientists and support personnel. Each overwintering team arrives during the summer expedition and take-over period aboard the research and logistics vessel S. A. Agulhas II, stays at the base through the austral winter and returns to South Africa at the end of the next summer season - an expedition of approximately 16 months.

Nordenskiöld Base

The Swedish Wasa station and the Finnish Aboa station together make up the Nordenskiöld Base, and cooperate in research and logistics. Research carried out includes geodesy/mapping, glaciology, human biology, meteorological observations, geology and geophysics.

Neumayer-Station III
The German Neumayer-Station III, finished in 2009, succeeded two former stations that were buried by snow and ice. It conducts geophysical, meteorological and seismological research, as well as air chemistry measurements and atmospheric ozone monitoring. Germany's other station, Kohnen, was opened as part of a major ice-drilling project.

It is named after geophysicist Georg von Neumayer. The station's assembly kit was transported to its current position early in November 2007. It is moving with the shelf ice at about 200 meters per year towards the open sea. After almost ten years of work on the project, beginning in October 1999, including conception, environmental impact assessment, planning and construction phases, regular operation of the station began on 20 February 2009. The station replaces the Neumayer-Station II and the Georg-von-Neumayer-Station that preceded it. The expected lifespan of the station is 25 to 30 years and the entire project is estimated to cost €39 million.

Maitri

Maitri station succeeded Dakshin Gangotri station in 1989, India's first Antarctic base. Maitri's research focus on geology, and the study of the supercontinent Gondwana, when India and Antarctica belonged to the same landmass. It also includes low-temperature engineering research that is relevant to conditions in the Himalayas.

Showa Station

Showa Station is Japan's main research station in Antarctica. A vast array of research is conducted there, including upper atmosphere physics, meteorology, seismology, gravimetry, geodesy/mapping, oceanography, glaciology, geology, marine and terrestrial biology, and medical research. Japan's other station, Dome Fuji Station was opened as part of a major ice-coring project.  It mainly studies climate change and conducts deep drilling and atmospheric observations.

Princess Elisabeth Antarctica

Princess Elisabeth Antarctica was established by Belgium as a project to promote polar sciences, as well as to demonstrate the possibility of building a Zero emission station. Research is conducted by an international team of scientists, studying climatology, glaciology and microbiology. It went into service on February 15, 2009. The station, designed, built and operated by the International Polar Foundation, is the first polar base that combines eco-friendly construction materials, clean and efficient energy use, optimization of the station's energy consumption and clever waste management techniques through the use of a micro smart grid. The station is connected to nine wind turbines that stretch out along the Utsteinen ridge. It houses up to 16 scientists at a time. 
 
The station can withstand such strong winds through its aerodynamic shape and its foundation anchoring of several metres deep into the permafrost. Philippe Samyn, a Belgian architect, was involved in designing the shell and underlying structure. The upper deck of the building is the actual station and looks over the ridge edge. The lower deck contains a garage for snowcat vehicles and other utilities. The station is named after Elisabeth, Duchess of Brabant, Princess of Belgium, the eldest daughter and heiress apparent of Philippe, King of the Belgians.

Kohnen Station

Kohnen-Station is a German summer-only station, able to accommodate up to 20 people. It is named after the geophysicist Heinz Kohnen (1938–1997), who was for a long time the head of logistics at the Alfred Wegener Institute. The station opened in 2001,  and is the logistic base for the ice coring project in Dronning Maud Land, the European Project for Ice Coring in Antarctica (EPICA). The station is supplied by a convoy of 6 towing vehicles, which resupply it twice a year.

List of current research stations

The following table lists the currently operational research stations in Queen Maud Land, sorted from westernmost to easternmost. The population figures show the winter average first (if applicable) and the peak (or maximum capacity in the case of the newly opened Princess Elisabeth Base) population last.

See also
Research stations in Antarctica

References

Antarctica-related lists
Government research
Science and technology in Antarctica